The Republic of Ararat, or Kurdish Republic of Ararat, ( and ) was a self-proclaimed Kurdish state from 1927 to 1931. It was located in eastern Turkey, centred on Karaköse Province. "Agirî" is the Kurdish name for Ararat.

History 
The Republic of Ararat, led by the central committee of Xoybûn party, declared independence on 28 October 1927 or 1928, during a wave of rebellion among Kurds in southeastern Turkey. As the leader of the military was appointed Ihsan Nuri, and Ibrahim Heski was put in charge of the civilian government.

At the first meeting of Xoybûn, Ihsan Nuri Pasha was declared the military commander of the Ararat Rebellion. Ibrahim Heski was made the leader of the civilian administration. In October 1927, Kurd Ava, or Kurdava, a village near Mount Ararat, was designated as the provisional capital of Kurdistan. Xoybûn made appeals to the Great Powers and the League of Nations and also sent messages to other Kurds in Iraq and Syria to ask for co-operation. But under the pressure from Turkey, the British Empire as well as France imposed restrictions on the activities of the members of Xoybûn.

The Turkish Armed forces subsequently defeated the Republic of Ararat in September 1931.

Flag of the Republic of Ararat 

The flag first appeared during the movement for Kurdish independence from the Ottoman Empire and resembles an earlier version created by the Xoybûn (Khoyboun) organization, active in the Ararat rebellion of 1930, and flown by the break-away Republic of Ararat during the period 1927–1931.

See also

 List of Kurdish dynasties and countries
 Flag of Kurdistan

References

 
States and territories established in 1927
States and territories disestablished in 1930
Former Kurdish states in Turkey
Former republics
Former countries of the interwar period
Mount Ararat